In mathematical logic and metalogic, a formal system is called complete with respect to a particular property if every formula having the property can be derived using that system, i.e. is one of its theorems; otherwise the system is said to be incomplete.
The term "complete" is also used without qualification, with differing meanings depending on the context, mostly referring to the property of semantical validity. Intuitively, a system is called complete in this particular sense, if it can derive every  formula that is true.

Other properties related to completeness

The  property converse to completeness is called soundness: a system is sound with respect to a property (mostly semantical validity) if each of its theorems has that property.

Forms of completeness

Expressive completeness
A formal language is expressively complete if it can express the subject matter for which it is intended.

Functional completeness

A set of logical connectives associated with a formal system is functionally complete if it can express all propositional functions.

Semantic completeness
Semantic completeness is the converse of soundness for formal systems. A formal system is complete with respect to tautologousness or "semantically complete" when all its tautologies are theorems, whereas a formal system is "sound" when all theorems are tautologies (that is, they are semantically valid formulas: formulas that are true under every interpretation of the language of the system that is consistent with the rules of the system). That is,

For example, Gödel's completeness theorem establishes semantic completeness for first-order logic.

Strong completeness
A formal system  is strongly complete or complete in the strong sense if for every set of premises Γ, any formula that semantically follows from Γ is derivable from Γ. That is:

Refutation completeness
A formal system  is refutation-complete if it is able to derive false from every unsatisfiable set of formulas. That is,

Every strongly complete system is also refutation-complete.

Examples of refutation-complete systems include: SLD resolution on Horn clauses, superposition on equational clausal first-order logic, Robinson's resolution on clause sets. However,  can be derived.

Syntactical completeness
This is also called negation completeness, and is stronger than semantic completeness. In another sense, a formal system is syntactically complete if and only if no unprovable sentence can be added to it without introducing an inconsistency. Truth-functional propositional logic and first-order predicate logic are semantically complete, but not syntactically complete (for example, the propositional logic statement consisting of a single propositional variable A is not a theorem, and neither is its negation). Gödel's incompleteness theorem shows that any recursive system that is sufficiently powerful, such as Peano arithmetic, cannot be both consistent and syntactically complete.

Structural completeness

In superintuitionistic and modal logics, a logic is structurally complete if every admissible rule is derivable.

References

Mathematical logic
Metalogic
Model theory
Proof theory